K127 or K-127 may refer to:

K-127 (Kansas highway), a former state highway in Kansas
Kyocera K127, a cell phone
K. 127, a 1772 composition by Wolfgang Amadeus Mozart